Constantinos Makrides (born 13 January 1982) is a Cypriot international footballer who last played for Apollon Limassol as a central midfielder.

Club career

Apollon
Makrides started playing football at Apollon Academies and because of his talent was soon training with the first team. Despite this talent, the Limassol team decided to give him more time to mature his game, so he was transferred as a loan to Ethnikos Assia in 2001. The next season, he returned to Apollon and under the coaching of Dusan Mitošević became a starting line-up regular for the team, with 25 appearances. A star was rising but the 2002-03 was not a season for Makrides to remember since Ilie Dumitrescu did not use him. Having problems with the board and the coach, Makrides demanded to leave the team. His manager proposed him to Omonia but the Nicosia team refused. At the very last minute of the January transfer window he was signed to APOEL.

APOEL
Makrides move to APOEL was a successful one, and established himself as one of the best in the Cyprus League and also became a regular to the national team. He played mainly as a right winger for APOEL and won two championships, two cups and one super cup. He had also many European competitions appearances. Probably the best goal in his career so far is the goal against Maccabi Tel Aviv in the UEFA Cup where he started from his own half, passed the entire Maccabi defence and slid a shot past the goalkeeper.

Metalurh Donetsk
Makrides decided after the victory win over Anorthosis in the cup final 2008, to make a big step outside Cyprus and sign for Ukrainian outfit FC Metalurh Donetsk, a club that his friend and ex APOEL teammate Ricardo Fernandes played for. He was considered one of the key figures of the team, that finished 4th place in the Ukrainian Premier League 2008–09, winning a spot to the UEFA Europa League second qualifying round.

Omonia
Makrides decided after one year in Ukrainian Premier League 2008–09, to return to Cyprus. He signed for Omonia a 4-years contract in August 2009. He took the shirt with number 13. He established himself as one of the best players of Omonoia and he help the team to return to the titles after seven years without a title. In the 2011-2012 he is named as captain of the team.

Metalurh Donetsk
On 23 June 2012, Makrides returned to FC Metalurh Donetsk. He left the team two years later, due to the club's economic uncertainty.

APOEL
On 18 June 2015, Makrides returned to APOEL after seven years, signing a two-year contract with the club. After appearing in 24 matches in all competitions (including three appearances in the group stage of the UEFA Europa League for the first time in his career) and after only seven months in the club, his contract was mutually terminated on 8 January 2016.

International career
Constantinos Makrides is also a regular player for the Cyprus national football team and the current captain of the team. He played the full 90 minutes in all 4 games of Cyprus' Euro 2008 qualification campaign to date, including a 5–2 victory over Ireland and a 1–1 draw with Germany.

International goals
Scores and results list Cyprus' goal tally first.

Managerial statistics

Honours
APOEL
Cypriot League: 2003–04, 2006–07
Cypriot Cup:2005–06, 2007–08
Cypriot Super Cup: 2004

Omonia
Cypriot League: 2009–10
Cypriot Cup: 2010–11, 2011–12
Cypriot Super Cup: 2010

References

External links
 APOEL official profile 
 
 

1982 births
Living people
Sportspeople from Limassol
Greek Cypriot people
Cypriot footballers
Association football midfielders
Apollon Limassol FC players
Ethnikos Assia FC players
APOEL FC players
FC Metalurh Donetsk players
AC Omonia players
Cypriot First Division players
Ukrainian Premier League players
Expatriate footballers in Ukraine
Cypriot expatriate footballers
Cyprus international footballers
Apollon Limassol FC managers